A boat neck, also called a bateau neck or Sabrina neckline, is a wide neckline that runs horizontally, front and back, almost to the shoulder points, across the collarbone.  It is traditionally used in nautically inspired sweaters and knitwear, but is also featured in more elegant cocktail dresses and eveningwear.  The style derives from sailors' blouses or sweaters, often with wide navy and white horizontal stripes.

History
A striped boat neck shirt was used in sailors' uniforms by the French Navy in 1858. The wide, plain neck was said to facilitate quick removal if a sailor were to fall overboard. The style was adopted by the Russians and other navies in the following years.

It came into prominence in fashion in the 1920s, and was popularised by Coco Chanel in the '30s.

In the '50s and '60s plain boat neck shirts were worn by artists, and became associated with beatnik culture.

Boat necks became more prominent in fashion in the 2010s as Meghan Markle was photographed wearing them, in what some magazines claimed was a signature style.

Gallery

References

Necklines